The 1938 Rice Owls football team was an American football team that represented Rice University as a member of the Southwest Conference (SWC) during the 1938 college football season. In its fifth season under head coach Jimmy Kitts, the team compiled a 4–6 record (3–3 against SWC opponents) and was outscored by a total of 133 to 91.

Schedule

References

Rice
Rice Owls football seasons
Rice Owls football